The Annunciation is the Christian celebration of the announcement by the archangel Gabriel to the virgin Mary that she would become the mother of Jesus Christ.

Annunciation may also refer to:

 Annunciation to the shepherds, in which angels tell a group of shepherds about the birth of Jesus
 Annunciation to Joseph, when Joseph is told in a dream Mary has conceived by the Holy Spirit

Paintings 
 Annunciation (Fra Angelico, Madrid), 1425–26
 Annunciation (Fra Angelico, San Marco), c. 1450, in Florence, Italy
 Annunciation of Cortona, 1433–1434, by Fra Angelico
 Annunciation of San Giovanni Valdarno, c. 1430–1432, by Fra Angelico
 Annunciation (Antonello da Messina), 1474, in Syracuse, Italy
 Annunciation (Bellini), c. 1500, by Giovanni Bellini, in Venice, Italy
 Annunciation (Botticelli, Glasgow), 1490
 Annunciation (Botticelli, New York), c. 1485–1492
 Annunciation (Caravaggio), 1608, in Nancy, France
 Annunciation (Cima), 1495, in Saint Petersburg, Russia
 Annunciation (Correggio), 1524–25, in Parma, Italy
 The Annunciation, with Saint Emidius, 1486, by Carlo Crivelli, in London, England
 Annunciation (Artemisia Gentileschi), 1630, in Naples, Italy
 Annunciation (Orazio Gentileschi, 1600), in Newark, Delaware, US
 Annunciation (Orazio Gentileschi, 1623), in Turin, Italy
 Annunciation (El Greco, Illescas), 1603–1605
 Annunciation (El Greco, Madrid), 1609, in a private collection in Madrid, Spain
 Annunciation (El Greco, Museo Thyssen-Bornemisza), 1575–1576, in Madrid, Spain
 Annunciation (El Greco, Museo del Prado, 1600), part of the Doña María de Aragón Altarpiece
 Annunciation (El Greco, Prado, 1570), 1570, in Madrid, Spain
 Annunciation (El Greco, Sigüenza), 1614
 Annunciation (El Greco, São Paulo Museum of Art), 1600, in São Paulo, Brazil
 Annunciation (Guercino), 1646
 Annunciation (Master Jerzy), 1517, in Kraków, Poland
 Annunciation (Lanfranco, Rome), c. 1615–1624
 Annunciation (Leonardo), 1472–1475, in Florence, Italy
 Annunciation (Filippo Lippi, London), c. 1449–1459
 Annunciation (Lippi, Munich), 1443–1450, by Filippo Lippi
 Annunciation (Lippi, Rome), 1445–1450, by Filippo Lippi
 Annunciation with two Kneeling Donors (Lippi), 1440–1445
 Annunciation (Lochner), c. 1440, by Stefan Lochner, in Cologne, Germany
 Annunciation (Ambrogio Lorenzetti), 1344, in Siena, Italy
 Annunciation with St. Margaret and St. Ansanus, by Simone Martini and Lippo Memmi, in the Uffizi in Florence, Italy
 Annunciation (Masolino), c. 1423–1424 or c. 1427–1429, in Washington, D.C., US
 Annunciation (Memling), c. 1482, in New York City, New York, US
 Annunciation (Moretto), 1535–1540
 Annunciation of Fano, c. 1488–1490, by Pietro Perugino
 Annunciation (Pittoni), c. 1757
 Annunciation (Pontormo), 1528, in Florence, Italy
 Annunciation (Previtali), 1505–1510, by Andrea Previtali, in Meschio, Italy
 Annunciation (Reni), 1629
 Annunciation (Rubens), two paintings by Peter Paul Rubens
 Annunciation (Signorelli), 1491, in Volterra, Italy
 The Annunciation (Tanner), 1898, by Henry Ossawa Tanner, in Philadelphia, Pennsylvania, US
 Annunciation (church of San Salvador), 1559–64, by Titian, in Venice, Italy
 Annunciation (Uccello), c. 1425
 Annunciation (van Eyck, Madrid), 1434–36
 Annunciation (van Eyck, Washington), 1434–36
 Annunciation (Veronese, Uffizi), c. 1556, by Paolo Veronese, in Florence, Italy
 Annunciation (Wautier), 1659, by Michaelina Wautier, in Marly-le-Roi, France
 Annunciation Triptych (Lorenzo Monaco)
 Annunciation Triptych (Rogier van der Weyden)
 Ustyug Annunciation, 12th-century Russian Orthodox icon from Novgorod

Sculptures
Annunciation (Vittoria), c. 1583, by Alessandro Vittoria, in Chicago, Illinois, US

Film
 The Annunciation (film), a 1984 Hungarian film directed by András Jeles

See also 

 Enunciation, announcing, proclaiming, or making known
 Annunciade, several religious and military orders
 Annunciation Church (disambiguation)
 Annunciation School (disambiguation)
 Annunciation Monastery (disambiguation)
 Annunciation Bridge, across the Neva River in Saint Petersburg, Russia